Fikri Alican (2 April 1929 – 19 August 2015) was a Turkish scientist and physician with various contributions to medical science, ranging from organ transplantation to physiology.

Early life and career

Alican was born in Adapazarı, a city in northwestern Turkey, 150 km east of Istanbul. He left his hometown after middle school, attending high school and college in Istanbul, where he graduated from Robert College with a B.S. (1949) and from Istanbul University with an M.D. (1955). He did his residency at the Istanbul University Medical Center's Clinic of Treatment and Exploratory Surgery, also known as Surgical Clinic #4, headed by Şinasi Hakkı Erel. It is there that he met his future wife, Halide Ihlamur, later Halide Alican, a surgical nurse working at the same clinic.

After completing his residency in general surgery at Istanbul University, his growing interest in the field of organ transplantation, then in its heyday, took him to Jackson, Mississippi, where he joined the University of Mississippi team leading the world in transplantation research, including the first lung transplant (11 June 1963) and the first heart transplant (23 January 1964), under the leadership of James D. Hardy. A few weeks after his arrival there in the summer of 1960, he proposed to Ihlamur, as he always called her, even after she took his name and dropped hers, and they got married in Jackson in November 1960, remaining married for fifty-five years (1960–2015) until his death at age eighty-six. He also obtained a master's degree (M.S., 1962) in physiology at the University of Mississippi, studying with Arthur C. Guyton, while working as a research fellow (soon to become a research associate) in Hardy's department of surgery.

Best known for his work in organ transplantation, though with some notable initiatives in physiology as well, Alican later established a successful private practice as a general surgeon. His professional career was divided between medical research in the United States and private practice in Turkey.

Main Contributions 

Alican's main contributions came in the 1960s (1960–1971) when he worked at the University of Mississippi Medical Center (UMMC) in the pioneering days of laboratory research and clinical studies in organ transplantation. His research focused largely on the lungs and on the liver, though he is also known for his work on intestinal transplantation. He performed the first ever simultaneous bilateral lung transplantation in canines, one of many such operations paving the way for the procedure in humans.

His role in the development of surgical techniques in transplantation was complemented by his work in physiology, including transplantation biology in general as well as a particular specialty in the physiology of shock.

Relocating to Istanbul in 1971, he held a professorship in surgery at Istanbul University until 1979, turning to private practice upon the institution of legal and regulatory changes barring academic physicians from working outside the university. At the time of his departure from the University of Mississippi, he was an attending surgeon at the university hospital as well as associate director of the transplantation program there. Twenty years later, he became a founding member ("fellow") of the James D. Hardy Society, established in 1991.

He has published extensively both in English and in Turkish. His journal articles, mostly in English, are almost exclusively in the areas of organ transplantation and physiology. His monographs, all in Turkish, are more diverse, ranging from general surgery to organ transplantation to cancer research and the in-depth study of various other diseases. The division mirrors the transformation of his career from medical research in the United States to general surgery in Turkey.

His autobiography (2000/2007) describes that transformation as coming with a natural obstacle to research: the relative scarcity of institutional resources in Turkey at that time. He notes that this not only held back progress in laboratory and clinical studies but also impeded scholarly initiatives inevitably undermined by the inadequacy of academic libraries. The solution he reports having implemented is the creation and maintenance of his own library, complete with a card catalog, populated with entries from leading medical journals acquired with his own funds. Specifically, he reports having maintained personal subscriptions to twenty-two medical journals for over thirty years. He identifies these periodical holdings, supplemented by the selective acquisition of books on an ongoing but less regular schedule, as the main flow of information for the wall-to-wall card catalog in his office where he would personally enter the bibliographic details of each article in every issue. Alican credits this makeshift system for enabling him to publish a combined total of 3,000 pages on top of his output in the United States.

Selected publications

Books

Articles

Notes

References

Gallery 

Turkish transplant surgeons
Cancer researchers
Turkish physiologists
Turkish medical researchers
Robert College alumni
Istanbul University alumni
University of Mississippi alumni
1929 births
2015 deaths